Chenar-e Golaban (also Romanized as Chenār-e Golābān; also known as Golābān-e Do, Chenār-e Golābān-e Do, and Nūshād Golābān-e Yeḵ) is a village in Veysian Rural District, Veysian District, Dowreh County, Lorestan Province, Iran. At the 2006 census, its population was 84, in 20 families.

References 

Towns and villages in Dowreh County